The moths of Djibouti represent about 12 known moth species. Moths (mostly nocturnal) and butterflies (mostly diurnal) together make up the taxonomic order Lepidoptera.

This is a list of moth species which have been recorded in Djibouti.

Geometridae
Eupithecia dayensis Herbulot, 1983
Eupithecia urbanata D. S. Fletcher, 1956

Noctuidae
Acontia dichroa (Hampson, 1914)
Acontia insocia (Walker, 1857)
Feliniopsis consummata (Walker, 1857)
Honeyia clearchus (Fawcett, 1916)
Odontoretha gigas Laporte, 1984
Stenosticta coppensi Laporte, 1977

Saturniidae
Gynanisa jama Rebel, 1915
Holocerina menieri Rougeot, 1973
Holocerina smilax (Westwood, 1849)

Sphingidae
Macropoliana afarorum Rougeot, 1975

References

External links 
 

Moths
Djibouti
Djibouti
Moths